Mesyagutovo (Mäsäğüt) is a rural locality (a selo) and the administrative centre of Mesyagutovsky Selsoviet, Yanaulsky District, Bashkortostan, Russia. The population was 177 as of 2010. There are 3 streets.

Geography 
Mesyagutovo is located 42 km southeast of Yanaul (the district's administrative centre) by road. Stary Aldar is the nearest rural locality.

References 

Rural localities in Yanaulsky District